The Center for Clean Air Policy (CCAP) is an independent, nonprofit think tank that was founded in 1985 in the United States. CCAP works on climate and air quality policy issues at the local, national and international levels. Headquartered in Washington, D.C., CCAP helps policy-makers around the world to develop, promote and implement market-based approaches to address climate, air quality and energy problems while trying to balance both environmental and economic interests.

Overview
CCAP was founded by Ned Helme, a leading expert on climate and air policy. Helme advises Members of Congress, state and international governments, the European Commission and developing countries on climate and air policy issues.

Current CCAP U.S. and International Initiatives
Stakeholder dialogues
Education and outreach
Qualitative and quantitative research
Technical analyses of emission mitigation and climate adaptation options
Policy recommendation development

Programs

United States
CCAP leads four initiatives in the U.S. that engage all levels of government and involve stakeholders from diverse interests. These initiatives are:
U.S. Climate Policy Program, designing policy recommendations to help shape a cost-effective  climate change policy to reduce emissions, transition to a low-carbon economy and position the U.S. as a leader in the international climate negotiations;
Urban Leaders Adaptation Initiative, partnering with large counties and cities to build resiliency to adapt to climate change impact through smart land-use and urban planning;
California Climate Program, assisting California state agencies to design and implement California's landmark climate policies, including AB 32 and SB 375; and
Transportation and Climate Change Program, reducing transportation emissions through improved land use and travel efficiency.

Global
CCAP works extensively in Europe, Asia and Central and South America. The major international initiatives are:
Mitigation Action Implementation Network (MAIN) works to support the design and implementation of Nationally Appropriate Mitigation Actions (NAMAs) and Low-Emissions Development Strategies (LEDS) in developing countries through regionally-based dialogues, web-based exchanges, and practitioner networks.
International Future Actions Dialogue (FAD) to Address Global Climate Change, combining in-depth analysis and development of policy options;
European Climate and Energy Dialogue, developing medium- to long-term climate change, energy and finance policy for the European Union (EU);
Developing Countries Project, collaborating with research teams in China, India, Brazil and Mexico to identify technologies and approaches to reduce greenhouse gas (GHG) emissions;
Sectoral Study, exploring actions necessary for sectoral approaches to become a key tool in the mitigation of GHG emissions and as a component of a post-2012 international climate change agreement; and
Forestry and Climate Change Program, reducing GHG emissions from deforestation and forest degradation.

References

External links
 

Air pollution in the United States
Air pollution organizations
Think tanks established in 1985
Think tanks based in the United States
1985 establishments in the United States